Pottia is a genus of mosses belonging to the family Pottiaceae.

The genus has cosmopolitan distribution.

Species:
 Pottia acaulis (Flörke ex F.Weber & D.Mohr) Fürnr. ex Hampe 
 Pottia affinis (Hook. & Taylor) Herrnst. & Heyn

References

Pottiaceae
Moss genera